Peter Jeppsson (born 1968), is a Swedish social democratic politician served as member of the Riksdag from 2006 to 2018.

References

External links
Peter Jeppsson (S)

1968 births
Living people
Members of the Riksdag from the Social Democrats
Members of the Riksdag 2006–2010
Members of the Riksdag 2010–2014
Members of the Riksdag 2014–2018